Damir Bjelopoljak is a Bosnian volleyball player at the highest national level. He was born in Kakanj, Bosnia and Herzegovina. He plays for OK Kakanj in the Premier League of Volleyball of Bosnia and Herzegovina. He is 194 cm tall and plays as Setter.

Damir Bjelopoljak has spent most of his playing career at OK Kakanj, Bosnia's most successful volleyball club, 1994–1999, 2004–2006 and 2008-2010.  He was a member of the Premier League of Volleyball of Bosnia and Herzegovina national championship winning team 4 times (2004, 2005, 2008 and 2010)) and the National Cup of Bosnia and Herzegovina 5 times (2004, 2006, 2008, 2009 and 2010).

He has been a member of OK Kakanj's national Cup and League double-winning team three times, including the third consecutive occasion in 2010. He has also competed for the club at European level in the CEV Challenge Cup in 2008 and 2010.

Clubs

See also
Almir Aganović, Haris Zolota, Ermin Lepić

References

External links
  Photograph of 2010 Cup and League double-winning team, Aganović, Salihović, Karišik, Karić, Hernandez, Zolota, Knežević, Lepić, Bešlić, Ćorić, Bjelopoljak, trainer Almir Begić, accessed 27 December 2010

Bosnia and Herzegovina men's volleyball players
1979 births
Living people